The 1983 Texas A&M Aggies football team represented Texas A&M University in the 1983 NCAA Division I-A football season as a member of the Southwest Conference (SWC). The Aggies were led by head coach Jackie Sherrill in his second season and finished with a record of five wins, five losses and one  (5–5–1 overall, 4–3–1 in the SWC).

Schedule

Roster

References

Texas AandM
Texas A&M Aggies football seasons
Texas AandM Aggies football